Terefundus quadricinctus is a species of sea snail, a marine gastropod mollusk in the family Muricidae, the murex snails or rock snails.

Subspecies
 Terefundus quadricinctus unicarinatus Dell, 1956

Description

Distribution
This marine species is endemic to New Zealand

References

Gastropods of New Zealand
Gastropods described in 1908
Pagodulinae